Elvina Esewvre Ibru is a Nigerian actress and On Air Personality from Delta State.

Early life and education 
She attended London Academy of Performing Arts (LAPA) in England. She later attended Webster University, Regents Park, London where she obtained a Bachelor of Arts degree in International Relations.

Career 
Ibru worked for the British Broadcasting Corporation (BBC) as a broadcaster and also acted in theatre productions before returning to Nigeria. She was also an OAP at Classic FM where she hosted a weekly show called Mellow Magic.

She played the lead role of Mopelola Holloway in Bolanle Austen Peters‘ movie, The Bling Lagosians. She has also acted in movies like Theo’s Dora and Letter to a Stranger. She plays the role of Atigbi in the Africa Magic original, Riona.

Ibru founded a movie production company named Twice As Nice. She has since produced the movie, Cajoling.

Personal life 
Ibru is a single mother to her son, named Elisha. She has also expressed her unwillingness to be married.

She disclosed on her Instagram page that she tested positive for COVID-19. She was once raped by armed robbers.

Filmography

Stage plays

Films

TV shows

Recognition 

 University of Lagos Faculty of Arts Students Association (FASA) Award for Developing Youth through Entertainment
 Beatz Award for On-Air Personality of the Year 2016
 Excellence Special Awards, Special Recognition for Excellence in Entertainment
Africa Movie Academy Awards, Nominated for best actress in a leading role for Bling Lagosians

References

External links 

Nigerian film actresses
Nigerian stage actresses
Nigerian film producers
Living people
21st-century Nigerian actresses
Year of birth missing (living people)
Nigerian television personalities
Webster University alumni
Nigerian women film producers